The Portrait of Karl V with a Dog is a portrait of Karl V, Holy Roman Emperor with a hunting dog, painted by Titian in 1533. It passed from Karl to the Spanish royal collection, from which it passed to its present owner, the Prado in Madrid.

Description

It is a copy or reinterpretation of a portrait of Karl painted in 1532 by Jakob Seisenegger. That portrait was natural but had not pleased its subject and so during his stay in Bologna in 1533 (when Titian also happened to be there) Karl paid Titian 500 ducats to paint a new version of it.

This new version is similar to its predecessor but completely transforms its composition, stylising Karl' body by increasing the size of the fur wrap, decreasing the size of the doublet, raising the position of the eyes and lowering the horizon to make Karl fill the space. He is also shown approaching the viewer and the space around him has been emptied and simplified, with warmer colours than in the original. It later inspired Goya's 1799 Charles IV in his Hunting Clothes.

References

 Falomir, Miguel (ed.) Tiziano, catálogo de la exposición celebrada en el Museo del Prado, Madrid, 2003, ISBN 84-8480-050-4
 Ferino-Pagden, Sylvia. ‘La imagen ideal y "natural" del poder: los retratos de Carlos V por Tiziano’, en Carolus, catálogo de la exposición celebrada en el Museo de Santa Cruz de Toledo, 2000-2001, pp. 67-78, ISBN 84-95146-45-2
 Stefano Zuffi. Tiziano. Mondadori Arte, Milano 2008. ISBN 978-88-370-6436-5

1533 paintings
Cultural depictions of Charles V, Holy Roman Emperor
Paintings by Titian in the Museo del Prado
Portraits of Charles V, Holy Roman Emperor
Charles V
Dogs in paintings by Titian